Bint al-sahn, also known as sabayah, is a Yemeni pastry made from a dough, which is prepared by mixing white flour, eggs, yeast and clarified butter, known as samn (سمن). It is baked in multiple layers and typically served with honey and sprinkled with habbat as sowda (Nigella sativa, black cumin).

Bint al-sahn is one of the most popular Yemeni dishes (along with shai haleeb). It is often translated as honey cake into English, but in reality falls more under the category of a rich, flaky pastry with is served with honey and melted ghee. Like most breads, its best when it is fresh and warm. This recipe seems very simple in terms of the ingredients; however, it is not the easiest dish to make. For this reason, it is rarely found in Yemeni restaurants and it is something which is most often made at home. The most important thing is that the layers need to be paper-thin. In order to achieve this, the dough needs to be the right consistency and the dough balls must be allowed to relax so that it becomes easy to toss them out.

See also

 Yemeni cuisine
 List of desserts

References

 Food Cultures of the World Encyclopedia: [Four Volumes] - Ken Albala. p. 320.
 Departures and Arrivals – Eric Newby. p. 148.

Breads
Yemeni desserts
Puff pastry